Uropeltis phipsonii, commonly known as Phipson's earth snake and Phipson's shieldtail, is a species of snake in the family Uropeltidae. The species is endemic to India.

Etymology
The specific name, phipsonii, and the common names are in honor of British naturalist Herbert Musgrave Phipson, one of the founders of the Bombay Natural History Society.

Geographic range
U. phipsonii is found in the Western Ghats, reported at several localities around Maharashtra including hills around Mumbai and Pune.

Habitat

Description
U. phipsonii is cylindrical-bodied and smooth-scaled. The head is narrower than the neck. The tail is very short, appearing to be cut slant-wise at the end. There is a broad yellow stripe on each side of the tail.

U. phipsonii is brown both dorsally and ventrally, either uniform or with yellowish dots. It has a short yellow streak on each side, beginning at the corner of the mouth. There is a yellow crossbar across the vent, connecting the yellow stripes on the sides of the tail.

Adults may attain 28 cm (11 inches) in total length (including tail).

The dorsal scales are arranged in 17 rows at midbody, in 19 rows behind the head. The ventrals number 144–157, and the subcaudals number 7–12.

The snout is obtusely pointed. The rostral is ⅓ the length of the shielded part of the head. The portion of the rostral visible from above is longer than its distance from the frontal. The nasals are in contact with each other behind the rostral. The frontal is longer than broad. The diameter of the eye is more than ½ the length of the ocular shield. The diameter of body goes 28 to 38 times into the total length. The ventrals are nearly twice as large as the contiguous scales. The end of the tail is flat dorsally, obliquely truncate, with strongly bicarinate or quadricarinate scales. The terminal scute has a transverse ridge and two points.

Behaviour
The behaviour of U. phipsonii is largely unknown. It lives underground, and is a burrower. It is active above ground after heavy rains. It is a docile snake.

Diet
U. phipsonii eats earthworms.

Reproduction
U. phipsonii is ovoviviparous.

Threats
U. phipsonii has many predators, including birds and wild boar.

References

Further reading

Boulenger GA (1890). The Fauna of British India, Including Ceylon and Burma. Reptilia and Batrachia. London: Secretary of State for India in Council. (Taylor and Francis, printers). xviii + 541 pp. (Silybura phipsonii, p. 266). 
Mason GE (1888). "Description of a new Earth-Snake of the Genus Silybura from the Bombay Presidency with Remarks on other little-known Uropeltidae". Annals and Magazine of Natural History, Sixth Series 1: 184–186. (Silybura phipsonii, new species, pp. 184–185).
Rajendran M (1985). Studies in Uropeltid Snakes. Madurai: Madurai University Press. 132 pp.
Sharma RC (2003). Handbook: Indian Snakes Kolkata: Zoological Survey of India. 292 pp. .
Smith MA (1943). The Fauna of British India, Ceylon and Burma, Including the Whole of the Indo-Chinese Sub-Region. Reptilia and Amphibia. Vol. III.—Serpentes. London: Secretary of State for India. (Taylor and Francis, printers). xii + 583 pp. (Silybura phipsoni, p. 82).
Whitaker R, Captain A (2007). Snakes of India: The Field Guide. Chennai: Draco Books. 495 pp. .

External links

 

Uropeltidae
Reptiles of India
Endemic fauna of the Western Ghats
Fauna of Maharashtra
Reptiles described in 1888